Jude Law is an English actor. Law rose to prominence with his role in Anthony Minghella's The Talented Mr. Ripley (1999), for which he won the BAFTA Award for Best Actor in a Supporting Role and was nominated for an Academy Award. He gained additional critical praise and accolades for Cold Mountain (2003), also directed by Minghella.

Law is known for his roles in franchises, including as Dr. Watson in Sherlock Holmes (2009) and Sherlock Holmes: A Game of Shadows (2011), as Albus Dumbledore in Fantastic Beasts: The Crimes of Grindelwald (2018) and Fantastic Beasts: The Secrets of Dumbledore (2022), and as Yon-Rogg in Captain Marvel (2019), the 21st installment in the Marvel Cinematic Universe. Other notable roles include Gattaca (1997), Enemy at the Gates (2001), A.I. Artificial Intelligence (2001), Road to Perdition (2002), The Holiday (2006) and The Grand Budapest Hotel (2014); and on television in The Young Pope (2016) and The New Pope (2020).

Film

Television

Theatre

References

External links
 
 
 
 Filmography Jude Law at the British Film Institute (BFI). Retrieved 25 May 2008.

Male actor filmographies
British filmographies